Epacris muelleri, commonly known as Mueller's heath, is a species of flowering plant in the heath family Ericaceae and is endemic to eastern New South Wales. It is an erect, or weak straggling shrub with more or less glabrous branchlets, elliptic leaves and white or cream-coloured, tube-shaped flowers.

Description
The anthers are visible at the top of the petal tube.

Taxonomy
Epacris muelleri was first formally described in 1854 by Otto Wilhelm Sonder in the journal Linnaea: ein Journal für die Botanik in ihrem ganzen Umfange, oder Beiträge zur Pflanzenkunde based on plant material collected in the Blue Mountains.

Distribution and habitat
This epacris grows with scrub or heath vegetation in sheltered places on damp sandstone rock faces in the Blue Mountains and Wollemi National Park.

References 

Flora of New South Wales
Flora of Victoria (Australia)
muelleri
Ericales of Australia
Taxa named by Otto Wilhelm Sonder